Simon Evans may refer to:
Simon Evans (comedian) (born 1965), English comedian
Simon Evans (writer) (1895–1950), English writer
Simon Evans (racing driver) (born 1990), New Zealand racing driver
Simon Evans (director) (born 1983), English theatre and television director, writer, and actor